Ben N. Hurt (c. 1933 – November 12, 2017) was an American college football player and coach. He served as the head football coach at Middle Tennessee State University from 1975 to 1978, compiling a record of 12–31–1.

Head coaching record

References

Year of birth missing
1930s births
2017 deaths
Middle Tennessee Blue Raiders football coaches
Houston Cougars football coaches
Middle Tennessee Blue Raiders football players
Texas A&M Aggies football coaches
People from Nashville, Tennessee
Coaches of American football from Tennessee
Players of American football from Tennessee